Putina District is one of five districts of the  San Antonio de Putina Province in Peru.

Geography 
Other mountains are listed below:

History 
Putina District was created in 1824.

Ethnic groups 
The people in the district are mainly indigenous citizens of Quechua descent. Quechua is the language which the majority of the population (67.02%) learnt to speak in childhood, 32.09% of the residents started speaking using the Spanish language (2007 Peru Census).

Mayors 
 2011-2014: Agustin Uriel Lama Quispe. 
 2007-2010: Alex Max Sullca Cáceres.

Festivities 
 June: Anthony of Padua.

See also 
 Administrative divisions of Peru

References

External links 

 Official web site
 INEI Peru